The 1968 North Carolina gubernatorial election was held on November 5, 1968. Democratic nominee Robert W. Scott defeated Republican nominee Jim Gardner with 52.70% of the vote.

Primary elections
Primary elections were held on May 4, 1968.

Democratic primary

Candidates
Robert W. Scott, incumbent Lieutenant Governor
J. Melville Broughton Jr., attorney and chair of the North Carolina Democratic Party
Reginald A. Hawkins, civil rights activist and dentist

Results

Republican primary

Candidates
Jim Gardner, U.S. Representative
John L. Stickley

Results

General election

Candidates
Robert W. Scott, Democratic
Jim Gardner, Republican

Results

References

1968
North Carolina
Gubernatorial
November 1968 events in the United States